Henry Worral may refer to:

Henry Worrall (artist) (1825–1902), English-American artist
Henry Worrall (minister) (1862–1940), English-Australian minister